R23 or R-23 may refer to:

Military
 R-23 (missile), a Soviet air-to-air missile
 , a destroyer of the Royal Navy
 Rikhter R-23, a Soviet aircraft autocannon
 , a submarine of the United States Navy

Roads
 R23 road (Belgium)
 R-23 regional road (Montenegro)
 R23 highway (Russia)
 R23 (South Africa)

Other uses 
 R23: Toxic by inhalation, a risk phrase
 Fluoroform, a refrigerant
 Kwambi dialect
 Renault R23, a Formule One racing car
 Rubik R-23 Gébics, a Hungarian training glider